"Honky Tonk Women" is a song by the English rock band the Rolling Stones. It was released as a non-album single on 4 July 1969 in the United Kingdom, and a week later in the United States (although a country version called "Country Honk" was later included on the album Let It Bleed). It topped the charts in both nations. The song was on Rolling Stones 500 Greatest Songs of All Time list, and was inducted into the Grammy Hall of Fame.

Inspiration and recording
The song was written by Mick Jagger and Keith Richards while on holiday in Brazil from late December 1968 to early January 1969, inspired by Brazilian "caipiras" (inhabitants of rural, remote areas of parts of Brazil) at the ranch where Jagger and Richards were staying in Matão, São Paulo. Two versions of the song were recorded by the band: the familiar hit which appeared on the 45 single and their collection of late 1960s singles, Through the Past, Darkly (Big Hits Vol. 2); and a honky-tonk version entitled "Country Honk" with slightly different lyrics, which appeared on Let It Bleed (1969).

Thematically, a "honky tonk woman" refers to a dancing girl in a western bar; the setting for the narrative in the first verse of the rock-and-roll version is Memphis, Tennessee: "I met a gin soaked bar-room queen in Memphis", while "Country Honk" sets the first verse in Jackson, Mississippi: "I'm sittin' in a bar, tipplin' a jar in Jackson".

The band initially recorded the track called "Country Honk," in London in early March 1969. Brian Jones was present during these sessions and may have played on the first handful of takes and demos. It was his last recording session with the band. The song was transformed into the familiar electric, riff-based hit single "Honky Tonk Women" sometime in the spring of 1969, prior to Mick Taylor joining the group. In an interview in the magazine Crawdaddy!, Richards credits Taylor for influencing the track: "... the song was originally written as a real Hank Williams/Jimmie Rodgers/1930s country song. And it got turned around to this other thing by Mick Taylor, who got into a completely different feel, throwing it off the wall another way."  However, in 1979 Taylor recalled it this way: "I definitely added something to Honky Tonk Women, but it was more or less complete by the time I arrived and did my overdubs."

"Honky Tonk Women" is distinctive as it opens not with a guitar riff, but with a beat played on a cowbell. The Rolling Stones' producer Jimmy Miller played the cowbell for the recording.

The concert rendition of "Honky Tonk Women" on Get Yer Ya-Ya's Out! (1970) differs significantly from the studio hit, with a markedly dissimilar guitar introduction and the first appearance on vinyl of an entirely different second verse. During the North American leg of the 1989 Steel Wheels tour, a pair of 60-foot tall inflatable Honky Tonk women were cued to appear and bob to the music just before the first chorus. There was an animated live visual for this song when it was performed in concert around 2002 and 2003. It featured a topless woman riding on the Rolling Stones tongue who was seen in the beginning of the concert.

Release
The single was released in the UK the day after the death of founding member Brian Jones, with "You Can't Always Get What You Want" as the single's B-side. In the UK, it remained on the charts for seventeen weeks, peaking at number one for five weeks. It remains the band's last single to reach number one in their home country. The song also topped the US Billboard Hot 100 for four weeks from 23 August 1969. It was later released on the compilation album Through the Past, Darkly (Big Hits Vol. 2) in September. Billboard ranked it as the No. 4 song overall for 1969.

At the time of its release, Rolling Stone magazine hailed "Honky Tonk Women" as "likely the strongest three minutes of rock and roll yet released in 1969". It was ranked number 116 on the list of [[Rolling Stone's 500 Greatest Songs of All Time|''Rolling Stones 500 Greatest Songs of All Time]] in April 2010. The song was later put into the track listing for the video game Band Hero.  In 2014, the song was inducted into the Grammy Hall of Fame.

Releases on compilation albums and live recordings
 Through the Past, Darkly (Big Hits Vol. 2) (1969)
 Hot Rocks 1964–1971 (1971)
 Rolled Gold: The Very Best of the Rolling Stones (1975)
 30 Greatest Hits (1977)
 Singles Collection: The London Years (1989)
 Forty Licks (2002)
 Singles 1968–1971 (2005)
 GRRR! (2012)

Concert versions of "Honky Tonk Women" are included on the albums Live'r Than You'll Ever Be (1969), 'Get Yer Ya-Ya's Out!' (recorded 1969, released 1970), Love You Live (recorded 1976, released 1977), Live Licks (recorded 2003, released 2004), Hyde Park Live (2013), Sticky Fingers (Deluxe and Super Deluxe editions) (recorded 1971, released 2015), Totally Stripped (recorded 1995, released 2016), and Havana Moon (2016).  The song has appeared in numerous Stones concert films and boxed sets, including Stones in the Park, Some Girls: Live In Texas '78, Let's Spend the Night Together, Stones at the Max, Voodoo Lounge Live, Bridges to Babylon Tour '97–98, Four Flicks, The Biggest Bang, Sweet Summer Sun: Hyde Park Live, and Havana Moon. Some of the live versions include a Paris verse not included on the original single.

"Country Honk"

"Country Honk" is a country version of "Honky Tonk Women", released five months later on the album Let It Bleed (1969). As noted above, the country arrangement was the original concept of "Honky Tonk Women". Richards has maintained that "Country Honk" is how "Honky Tonk Women" was originally written.

"Country Honk" was recorded at Olympic Studios. Byron Berline played the fiddle on the track, and has said that Gram Parsons was responsible for him being chosen for the job (Berline had previously recorded with Parsons' band the Flying Burrito Brothers). Producer Glyn Johns suggested that Berline should record his part on the pavement outside the studio to add ambiance to the number. Sam Cutler, the Rolling Stones' tour manager, performed the car horn at the beginning of the track. Nanette Workman performs backing vocals on this version (although the album sleeve credits actress Nanette Newman). Berline's fiddle and all vocals were recorded at Elektra. There is a bootleg recording in existence that contains neither the fiddle nor Mick Taylor's slide guitar. 

Personnel
According to authors Philippe Margotin and Jean-Michel Guesdon, except where noted:

"Honky Tonk Women"The Rolling StonesMick Jagger lead vocal, backing vocal
Keith Richards backing vocal, lead guitar, rhythm guitar
Mick Taylor lead guitar (fills)
Bill Wyman bass
Charlie Watts drumsAdditional personnelNicky Hopkins piano
Jimmy Miller cowbell
Steve Gregory and Bud Beadle saxophones
Johnny Almond saxophone arrangements
Madeline Bell backing vocals

"Country Honk"The Rolling Stones Mick Jagger vocals, car horn
 Keith Richards backing vocals, acoustic guitar
 Mick Taylor steel slide guitar
 Charlie Watts drumsAdditional personnel'''
 Byron Berline violin
 Nanette Workman backing vocals

Charts and certifications

Weekly charts

Year-end charts

All-time charts

Certifications

Notes

References

Sources

 
 

The Rolling Stones songs
1969 singles
Decca Records singles
London Records singles
Billboard Hot 100 number-one singles
Cashbox number-one singles
UK Singles Chart number-one singles
Number-one singles in Australia
Number-one singles in New Zealand
Number-one singles in Switzerland
Irish Singles Chart number-one singles
Songs written by Jagger–Richards
Song recordings produced by Jimmy Miller
Ike & Tina Turner songs
Country rock songs
The Pogues songs
1969 songs